Donald S. McGill (July 20, 1906 – January 23, 1980) was an American politician from the state of Iowa.

McGill was born near Grandview, Iowa in 1906. He graduated from Grandview Consolidated High School in 1926. In 1932, he received his B.S. degree from Parsons College. He completed his education in 1938 by graduating from the University of Iowa. He served as a Democrat in the Iowa Senate from 1965 to 1971. McGill died in Chariton, Lucas County, Iowa in 1980. He was interred in Russell Cemetery, Russell, Iowa.

References

1906 births
1980 deaths
Iowa Democrats
Parsons College alumni
University of Iowa alumni